The 1985 San Francisco 49ers season was the franchise's 36th season in the National Football League and their 40th overall. 

49ers running back Roger Craig became the first player in NFL history to record both 1,000 rushing yards and 1,000 receiving yards in the same season. Craig rushed for 1,050 yards, and had 1,016 receiving yards.

This season was Jerry Rice's first season in the league.

Offseason

Personnel

Staff

Roster

Regular season

Schedule

Game summaries

Week 15 

    
    
    
    
    
    
    
    
    

Joe Montana 25/38, 354 Yds

Standings

Playoffs

NFC Wild Card

Awards and records 
Roger Craig, Led NFL, Receptions, 92 receptions

Milestones 
 Roger Craig, 1,000 yards rushing and 1,000 yards receiving in the same season

References

External links 
 1985 49ers on Pro Football Reference
 49ers Schedule on jt-sw.com

San Francisco
San Francisco 49ers seasons
1985 in San Francisco
San